Yashi Premkumar Pandey (born 23 June 1999) is an Indian cricketer who currently plays for Chhattisgarh. She plays primarily as a right-handed batter. She has previously played for Madhya Pradesh, as well India Green and Central Zone Under-19s. She made her domestic debut on 19 November 2015 in a one-day match for Madhya Pradesh against Karnataka.

References

External links

1999 births
Living people
Cricketers from Chhattisgarh
Chhattisgarh women cricketers
Madhya Pradesh women cricketers